West Pejaten (IPA: Pədʒaten) Is an administrative village In Pasar Minggu, South Jakarta, Jakarta, Indonesia.

Administrative villages in Jakarta